WNIN (channel 9) is a PBS member television station in Evansville, Indiana, United States. Owned by WNIN Tri-State Public Media, it is sister to NPR member station WNIN-FM (88.3). The two outlets share studios in downtown Evansville and transmitter facilities near Pelzer, Indiana.

Background
WNIN signed on for the first time on March 5, 1970, licensed to the Evansville Vanderburgh School Corporation (EVSC). After a few months as a member of National Educational Television (NET), it joined PBS in October.

Despite having the advantage of being on one of two VHF frequencies in the Tri-State, EVSC soon found itself in over its head running a full-service public television station. Within a year, WNIN was $59,000 in the red. Unable to raise enough money to close the gap, it took WNIN off the air in 1972. A year later, a group of Tri-State citizens formed Southwest Indiana Public Television (later known as Tri-State Public Teleplex and now known as Tri-State Public Media) and returned the station to the air. They bought the Carpenter House in 1986 and retired the mortgage on that building three years later with the help of a capital campaign.

WNIN also programs and transmits two local cable channels: WNIN Learn (Cable 12) and WNIN Create (Cable 13). WNIN Learn airs local Government-access television (GATV) for Vanderburgh County and Evansville City government meetings produced off-site inside the Carpenter House via remote-controlled cameras located in the Vanderburgh County Civic Center. WNIN Learn also airs repeats of some PBS Kids programs. WNIN Create simulcasts the national Create channel which features how-to, creative and cooking programs.

Local programs produced by WNIN include Lawmakers and Newsmakers, as well as various live debates and local documentaries. As of 2010, all local programming is available online via the station's implementation of PBS' COVE platform.

Digital television

Digital channels
The station's digital signal is multiplexed:

The station carries Create on digital channel 9.2. Until October 2012, the station offered an audio simulcast of sister NPR member station WNIN-FM on digital channel 9.3.

Analog-to-digital conversion
WNIN discontinued regular programming on its analog signal, over VHF channel 9, on June 12, 2009, the official date in which full-power television stations in the United States transitioned from analog to digital broadcasts under federal mandate. The station's digital signal relocated from its pre-transition VHF channel 12 to channel 9.

Indiana Channel 
WNIN was the programming hub of the Indiana Public Broadcasting Stations (IPBS) project, the Indiana Channel. From 2006 to 2016, the Indiana Channel had run on digital subchannel 9.2 (WNIN Create) from 4 to 7 p.m. every weekday.

References

External links
Official website

Television channels and stations established in 1970
NIN
1970 establishments in Indiana
PBS member stations